The Bournemouth Marathon was a road race run over the distance of 42.195 km or 26 miles and 385 yards. It took place each October in Bournemouth on the south coast of England. It was discontinued in 2020, although the half-marathon event continues.  The inaugural Bournemouth Marathon took place on 6 October 2013. It is part of a festival of running which includes a half marathon, 10km run along with shorter races.

The marathon held the IAAF Road Race Bronze Label status in the 2015, 2016 and 2017 editions.

Elite race winners
Key:

Marathon

Half Marathon

References

External links
Bournemouth Marathon official website
Bournemouth Marathon past years results

Marathons in the United Kingdom
Annual sporting events in the United Kingdom
Annual events in England
Autumn events in England